ISO 80000 or IEC 80000 is an international standard introducing the International System of Quantities (ISQ). 
It was developed and promulgated jointly by the International Organization for Standardization (ISO) and the International Electrotechnical Commission  (IEC).

It serves as a style guide for the use of physical quantities and units of measurement, formulas involving them, and their corresponding units, in scientific and educational documents for worldwide use.

The ISO/IEC 80000 family of standards was completed with the publication of Part 1 in November 2009.

Overview 
, ISO/IEC 80000 comprises 13 parts, two of which (parts 6 and 13) were developed by IEC and the remaining 11 were developed by ISO, with a further three parts (15, 16 and 17) under development. Part 14 was withdrawn.

Subject areas 
The 80000 standard currently has 13 parts.

Part 1: General 
ISO 80000-1:2009 replaces ISO 31-0:1992 and ISO 1000:1992.
It gives general information and definitions concerning quantities, systems of quantities, units, quantity and unit symbols, and coherent unit systems, especially the International System of Quantities (ISQ) and the International System of Units (SI).
The text of the informative sections of this document is publicly available.

Part 2: Mathematics 
ISO 80000-2:2019 revises ISO 80000-2:2009, which superseded ISO 31-11.
It specifies mathematical symbols, explains their meanings, and gives verbal equivalents and applications.
The text of the informative sections of this document is publicly available.

Part 3: Space and time 
ISO 80000-3:2019 revises ISO 80000-3:2006, which supersedes ISO 31-1 and ISO 31-2.
It gives names, symbols, definitions and units for quantities of space and time.
The text of this document is publicly available.

Part 4: Mechanics 
ISO 80000-4:2019 revises ISO 80000-4:2006, which superseded ISO 31-3.
It gives names, symbols, definitions and units for quantities of mechanics.
The text of this document is publicly available.

Part 5: Thermodynamics 
ISO 80000-5:2019 revises ISO 80000-5:2007, which superseded ISO 31-4.
It gives names, symbols, definitions and units for quantities of thermodynamics.
The text of this document is publicly available.

Part 6: Electromagnetism 
IEC 80000-6:2022 revises IEC 80000-6:2008, which superseded ISO 31-5 as well as IEC 60027-1.
It gives names, symbols, and definitions for quantities and units of electromagnetism.
The text of the informative sections of this document is publicly available.

Part 7: Light and radiation 
ISO 80000-7:2019 revises ISO 80000-7:2008, which superseded ISO 31-6.
It gives names, symbols, definitions and units for quantities used for light and optical radiation in the wavelength range of approximately 1 nm to 1 mm.
The text of this document is publicly available.

Part 8: Acoustics 
ISO 80000-8:2020 revises ISO 80000-8:2007, which revised ISO 31-7:1992.
It gives names, symbols, definitions and units for quantities of acoustics.
The text of the informative sections of this document are publicly available.

It has a foreword, scope introduction, scope, normative references (of which there are none), as well as terms and definitions. It includes definitions of sound pressure, sound power and sound exposure, and their corresponding levels: sound pressure level, sound power level and sound exposure level.  It includes definitions of the following quantities:
 logarithmic frequency range
 static pressure
 sound pressure
 sound particle displacement
 sound particle velocity
 sound particle acceleration
 volume flow rate, volume velocity
 sound energy density
 sound energy
 sound power
 sound intensity
 sound exposure
 characteristic impedance for longitudinal waves
 acoustic impedance
 sound pressure level
 sound power level
 sound exposure level
 reverberation time

Part 13: Information science and technology 
IEC 80000-13:2008 was reviewed and confirmed in 2022 and published in 2008, and replaces subclauses 3.8 and 3.9 of IEC 60027-2:2005 and IEC 60027-3.
It defines quantities and units used in information science, and specifies names and symbols for these quantities and units. It has a scope; normative references; names, definitions and symbols; and prefixes for binary multiples.

Quantities defined in this standard are:
 traffic intensity [A]: number of simultaneously busy resources in a particular pool of resources
 traffic offered intensity [A0]: traffic intensity ... of the traffic that would have been generated by the users of a pool of resources if their use had not been limited by the size of the pool
 traffic carried intensity [Y]: traffic intensity ... of the traffic served by a particular pool of resources
 mean queue length [L, (Ω)]: time average of queue length
 loss probability [B]: probability for losing a call attempt
 waiting probability [W]: probability for waiting for a resource
 call intensity, calling rate [λ]: number of call attempts over a specified time interval divided by the duration of this interval
 completed call intensity [μ]: call intensity ... for the call attempts that result in the transmission of an answer signal
 storage capacity, storage size [M]
 equivalent binary storage capacity [Me]
 transfer rate [r, (ν)]
 period of data elements  [T]
 binary digit rate, bit rate [rb, rbit (νb, νbit)]
 period of binary digits, bit period [Tb, Tbit]
 equivalent binary digit rate, equivalent bit rate [re, (νe)]
 modulation rate, line digit rate [rm, u]
 quantizing distortion power [TQ]
 carrier power [Pc, C]
 signal energy per binary digit [Eb, Ebit]
 error probability [P]
 Hamming distance [dn]
 clock frequency, clock rate [fcl]
 decision content [Da]
 information content [I(x)]
 entropy [H]
 maximum entropy [H0, (Hmax)]
 relative entropy [Hr]
 redundancy [R]
 relative redundancy [r]
 joint information content [I(x, y)]
 conditional information content [I(x|y)]
 conditional entropy, mean conditional information content, average conditional information content [H(X|Y)]
 equivocation [H(X∣Y)]
 irrelevance [C]
 transinformation content [T(x, y)]
 mean transinformation content [T]
 character mean entropy [H′]
 average information rate [H*]
 character mean transinformation content [T′]
 average transinformation rate [T*]
 channel capacity per character; channel capacity [C′]
 channel time capacity; channel capacity [C*]

The Standard also includes definitions for units relating to information technology, such as the erlang (E), bit (bit), octet (o), byte (B), baud (Bd), shannon (Sh), hartley (Hart) and the natural unit of information (nat).

Clause 4 of the Standard defines standard binary prefixes used to denote powers of 1024 as 10241 (kibi-), 10242 (mebi-), 10243 (gibi-), 10244 (tebi-), 10245 (pebi-), 10246 (exbi-), 10247 (zebi-) and 10248 (yobi-).

International System of Quantities

Part 1 of ISO 80000 introduces the International System of Quantities and describes its relationship with the International System of Units (SI).  Specifically, its introduction states "The system of quantities, including the relations among the quantities used as the basis of the units of the SI, is named the International System of Quantities, denoted 'ISQ', in all languages."  It further clarifies that "ISQ is simply a convenient notation to assign to the essentially infinite and continually evolving and expanding system of quantities and equations on which all of modern science and technology rests.  ISQ is a shorthand notation for the 'system of quantities on which the SI is based'."

Units of the ISO and IEC 80000 series
The standard includes all SI units but is not limited to only SI units. Units that form part of the standard but not the SI include the units of information storage (bit and byte), units of entropy (shannon, natural unit of information and hartley), the erlang (a unit of traffic intensity) and units of level (neper and decibel). 

The standard includes all SI prefixes as well as the binary prefixes kibi-, mebi-, gibi-, etc., originally introduced by the International Electrotechnical Commission to standardise binary multiples of byte such as mebibyte (MiB), for 2 bytes, to distinguish them from their decimal counterparts such as megabyte (MB), for precisely one million (2) bytes. In the standard, the application of the binary prefixes is not limited to units of information storage. For example, a frequency ten octaves above one hertz, i.e., 210 Hz, is one kibihertz (1 KiHz). These binary prefixes were standardized first in a 1999 addendum to IEC 60027-2.
The harmonized IEC 80000-13:2008 standard cancels and replaces subclauses 3.8 and 3.9 of IEC 60027-2:2005, which had defined the prefixes for binary multiples. The only significant change in IEC 80000-13 is the addition of explicit definitions for some quantities.

See also
 International Vocabulary of Metrology
 International System of Units
 BIPM – publishes freely available information on SI units
 NIST – official U.S. representative for SI; publishes freely available guide to use of SI

References

External links 
 BIPM SI Brochure
 ISO TC12 standards – Quantities, units, symbols, conversion factors
 NIST Special Publication 330 – The International System of Units
 NIST Special Publication 811 – Guide for the Use of the International System  of Units

 
+
Measurement
80000